General elections were held in Liechtenstein in February 1936. The elections took place in two rounds; in the first round on 3 February, each of the ten municipalities with more than 300 inhabitants elected one Landtag member. The second round was held on 16 February in which the remaining five Landtag members were elected in a national vote. The result was a victory for the ruling Progressive Citizens' Party, which won 11 of the 15 seats in the Landtag.

Results

Municipal vote

National vote

References

Liechtenstein
1936 in Liechtenstein
Elections in Liechtenstein
February 1936 events
Election and referendum articles with incomplete results